{{DISPLAYTITLE:Dihydroxyvitamin D3}}

Dihydroxyvitamin D3 may refer to:

 1,25-Dihydroxycholecalciferol (1,25-dihydroxyvitamin D3)
 24,25-Dihydroxycholecalciferol (24,25-dihydroxyvitamin D3) 
 Tacalcitol (1,24-dihydroxyvitamin D3)